Michael Hackett (born May 11, 1960) is a retired American professional basketball player. He was the 
Liga Profesional de Baloncesto MVP in 1984, and the Israeli League Top Scorer in 1991.

Basketball career
He attended Jacksonville University, where he was considered by University of Alabama at Birmingham coach Gene Bartow as "the best 6-5 player in America."

Hackett was drafted in 1982 by the Los Angeles Lakers with the 21st pick of the 3rd round of that year's National Basketball Association draft, but was released before the season started. He also played overseas, including in the Philippines for Ginebra San Miguel of the Philippine Basketball Association.

He was among the highest scoring imports in PBA history setting a then PBA record of 103 points against Great Taste in a game on November 21, 1985. This was later broken by Tony Harris' 105 points. In that same conference he won the PBA's Best Import of the Conference Award. The following year, he teamed up with Billy Ray Bates, forming what is considered to be the greatest import tandem in PBA history, leading Ginebra to the 1986 Open Conference title.

He was the Israeli League Top Scorer in 1991.

See also
List of basketball players who have scored 100 points in a single game

References

1960 births
Living people
African-American basketball players
American expatriate basketball people in Israel
American expatriate basketball people in the Philippines
American men's basketball players
Barangay Ginebra San Miguel players
Basketball players from South Carolina
Centers (basketball)
Guaiqueríes de Margarita players
Hapoel Afula players
Jacksonville Dolphins men's basketball players
Los Angeles Lakers draft picks
People from Orangeburg, South Carolina
Philippine Basketball Association imports
Power forwards (basketball)
Orangeburg-Wilkinson High School alumni
21st-century African-American people
20th-century African-American sportspeople